Lieutenant General Sarath Chand, PVSM, UYSM, AVSM, VSM is an Indian politician and former Vice Chief of Army Staff (VCOAS) of the Indian Army. He served as Vice Chief of Army Staff from 13 January 2017 till his retirement on 31 May 2018. He joined Bharatiya Janata Party on 6 April 2019.

Early life and education 
Chand was born in Kottarakkara, Kerala and is the son of late N. Prabhakaran Nair and G. Saradamma. He is an alumnus of Devi Vilasam Upper Primary School, Neduvathoor; Sainik School, Kazhakootam, National Defence Academy, Pune and Indian Military Academy, Dehradun. He also attended Defence Services Staff College, Wellington; higher command course at Army War College, Mhow and a National Defence College, New Delhi.

Military career 
Chand was commissioned into 11th Battalion the Garhwal Rifles in June 1979. He has vast experience spanning over 38 years and has served in all operational theatres and  held active combat leadership role at every stage of command. He has commanded a company in the Kargil Sector of Ladakh and another company during Operation Pawan as part of the Indian Peace Keeping Force (IPKF) in Sri Lanka. He has also commanded a battalion in Operation Rhino, targeted at infiltrators in Assam and Operation Falcon, along the Line of Actual control (LAC) in Arunachal Pradesh; an infantry brigade  in the desert, a counter-insurgency force in the Kashmir valley, IV Corps (Tezpur) and GOC-C South Western Command (Jaipur). In addition, he has held numerous staff and instructional appointments including instructor of the commando wing in infantry school . He was also served in the United Nations mission in Somalia (UNOSOM-II). He has also served as Colonel of the Regiment of Garhwal Rifles.

He assumed the office of VCOAS on 13 January 2017 after General Bipin Rawat was promoted to Chief of Army Staff (COAS). and retired on 31 May 2018, succeeded by Lt General Devraj Anbu.

During 38 years of his career he has been awarded the Vishisht Seva Medal in 2006, the Ati Vishisht Seva Medal in 2014, the Uttam Yudh Seva Medal in 2016  and the Param Vishisht Seva Medal in 2018.

Honours and decorations

Dates of rank

Personal life 
He is married to Bindu and they have two sons; Abhilash Chand, a major in the Indian Army Corps of Engineers and Abhijit Chand, a naval lieutenant.

References 

Living people
Vice Chiefs of Army Staff (India)
Recipients of the Ati Vishisht Seva Medal
Recipients of the Uttam Yudh Seva Medal
National Defence Academy (India) alumni
Recipients of the Param Vishisht Seva Medal
Year of birth missing (living people)
National Defence College, India alumni
Recipients of the Vishisht Seva Medal
Army War College, Mhow alumni
Defence Services Staff College alumni